Balesar may refer to:

 Balesar also Balesar Satan, a village in Rajasthan, India
 Balesar Durgawatan, a smaller village in Rajasthan, India
 Balesar tehsil, an administrative subdivision of Jodhpur District, Rajasthan, India
 Balesar, Karnataka, a small village in Uttar Kannada, Karnataka, India

See also
 Baleswar (disambiguation)